Mittelbrunn is a municipality in the district of Kaiserslautern, in Rhineland-Palatinate, western Germany.

Verena Chapel
The Verena Chapel in Mittelbrunn was first mentioned in 1496. The chapel was partially destroyed in the Thirty Years War (1618-1648). One last service was celebrated in 1718. Since at least the 18th century, the medieval chapel has been a decayed but eloquent presence in art and aesthetics.

International relations

Mittelbrunn is twinned with:
  Saint-Désir-de-Lisieux, France (1981)

References

External links

 
 

Municipalities in Rhineland-Palatinate
1230s establishments in the Holy Roman Empire
Kaiserslautern (district)
Populated places established in the 1230s